WEFUNK is a weekly radio show held on Montreal's CKUT 90.3, McGill University's radio station since 1996 and online since 1999.The show is usually very light on talk as both DJs Professor Groove and DJ Static play a symbiotic mix of Funk, Soul, R&B and Rap, both old and new.  The name of the radio show comes from the Parliament song "P. Funk (Wants To Get Funked Up)", in which WEFUNK is a fictional radio station broadcasting "directly from the Mothership, top of the Chocolate Milky Way, 500,000 kilowatts of P Funk-power."

WEFUNK expanded to include its own Internet radio stream in 1999, becoming one of the oldest continuously operating radio streams on the Internet, as well as one of the longest-running online radio shows. Since 2001, Apple has featured WEFUNK in its iTunes radio directory, introducing the show to a large worldwide audience.

The Program
Every Friday at midnight, WEFUNKs recurring introduction music kicks in, a sampled production of unknown source, and is usually finished off with a few rhyming words by Professor Groove; after that, two hours of music follows. Professor Groove is the one responsible for most of the Funk as DJ Static takes care of most of the rap. The duo often divide the show in four to six parts of 20 to 30 minutes.

The show features little talk. Typically there are two voiceover segments, at the start and end of the show, that usually last the length of a song. During those, the duo often report on the local music scene in Montreal, upcoming shows and news about CKUT.

Shows sometimes includes guests, some of them part of the 'WEFUNK family', to either perform sets, give interviews, perform live rapping, freestyling and beatboxing. Members include Butta Beats (rapper/beatboxing), Tony Ezzy (singer), Rawgged MC (rapper/beatboxing), and Rawsoul (DJ). There have also been a number of interviews with important members of the music community or part of history. Some of these include Marva Whitney, Kool Herc, Sharon Jones, Miles Tackett, etc.

Another subtle yet important part of WEFUNK culture are the 'sample moments'. As both music genres played go hand in hand in the creation process of producing beats by mashing up sampled breaks, both DJs will sometimes end and start their sets by playing corresponding songs. These do not happen every show as they often come about by coincidence; Either DJ sometimes will remember having a song that was sampled or that uses a sample that was played by the other in his record bag. These 'sample moments' are often explicitly mentioned in the archives, but there are a lot of hidden ones; Treasures for the keen listener.

Website
WEFUNK first began offering the show online via co-host Professor Groove's Funk website "The Groove Juicer" in 1999. The WEFUNK Radio website (wefunkradio.com) was launched in 2000 and is home to WEFUNKs radio stream, new episodes, and a comprehensive archive of episodes spanning back to 2001.

Show Archives
Since 1999, episodes of WEFUNK are recorded, cataloged and made available for online streaming. Each published show includes a playlist listing the songs that were played, including interviews and live freestyling sessions. The playlists are useful for fans of obscure funk because all song titles are easily accessible.

Shows are not added to the archive in real time; the usual delay is around two or three weeks.

Prior to 2002, the shows hosts were not always diligent with the note keeping process. This led to a good number of shows in the archive for which either a limited playlist or no playlist was available. Johnathan James started the WEFUNK Playlist Project, which sifted through the shows to identify many of songs featured. Due in part to this collaborative effort, all shows are now complete with a playlist, with just a handful of songs still unidentified.

Audience

In 2007, WEFUNK shows reach an audience of at least ten thousand regular listeners. Consistent with their roots in community radio, WEFUNK has maintained a DIY, ad-free ethic from the start, a position they've managed to sustain throughout over a decade of growing listenership thanks to hosting contributed by longtime listeners.

Involvement in early Internet radio

Streaming audio of WEFUNK episodes was first available in February 1999 with the launch of CKUT's radio stream, and expanded later that year with WEFUNK's independently operated radio stream dedicated to their own shows. Some credit the Australian program The Vinyl Lounge as the longest running internet radio show); they launched on NetFM.net in November 1998, about three months earlier than WEFUNK.

Prior to the popularity of podcasting, WEFUNK provided mp3 downloads of its shows beginning in 1999—first via FTP, then HTTP downloads. Podcasts were offered from 2004-2006. The extent of WEFUNKs catalog, combined with easy access to download episodes to digital audio players, led to attention in the press as podcasting gained popularity.

Recognition and critical response

WEFUNK was awarded "College Radio Show of the Year" in 2007 at the Stylus DJ Awards, a Canadian nationwide urban music awards event. WEFUNK was voted into the Montreal Mirror'''s top 10 "Best Local Radio Show" lists in their annual "Best of Montreal" reader's poll in 2009, 2008, 2006, 2005, and 2004. Esquire magazine noted WEFUNK for "grooves so gloriously nasty, they make James Brown look like Pat Boone". The New Haven Advocate wrote, "If you're looking for 'brash funk hypeness, hip-hop deep in the pocket,' screw the mainstream. This is it." Fortune Magazine wrote, "WeFunkRadio.com is just totally beautiful!" Wired magazine wrote that WEFUNK "keeps us going strong".

References

External links
 WEFUNKs Official Website
 Brief history of WEFUNK on the WEFUNK'' official website

Canadian hip hop
Canadian music radio programs
Internet radio stations in Canada
McGill University
Mass media in Montreal
1996 establishments in Quebec